Balia may refer to:

Places
Ballia, in Uttar Pradesh, India
Ballia district, in Uttar Pradesh, India
Balia, Bangladesh (disambiguation)
Balia, Mali

Electoral constituencies
Ballia (Lok Sabha constituency), in Uttar Pradesh, India
Balia, Bihar (Lok Sabha constituency), in Bihar, India
Ballia (Vidhan Sabha constituency), in Bihar, India